Brad Parks (born July 13, 1974) is an American author of mystery novels and thrillers. He is the winner of the 2010 and 2014 Shamus Award, the 2010 Nero Award and the 2013 and 2014 Lefty Award. He is the only author to have won all three of those awards. He writes both standalone domestic suspense novels and a series featuring investigative reporter Carter Ross, who covers crime for a fictional newspaper The Newark Eagle-Examiner, based in Newark, New Jersey. His novels are known for mixing humor with the gritty realism of their urban setting. Library Journal has called him "a gifted storyteller (with shades of Mark Twain or maybe Dave Barry)."

Background
Parks was born in New Jersey but grew up in Ridgefield, Connecticut, where he attended Ridgefield High School. He first started writing professionally for his hometown newspaper, The Ridgefield Press, at age 14, covering high school sports. He attended Dartmouth College, founding his own newspaper, The Sports Weekly (now defunct) and singing with the Dodecaphonics, a co-ed a cappella group. While still a student, he worked as a stringer for The New York Times and as an intern for The Boston Globe. After graduating Phi Beta Kappa from Dartmouth in 1996, he interned at The Washington Post, and was eventually hired full-time by the paper, which assigned him to a bureau in Manassas, Virginia. In 1998, he moved to The Star-Ledger and began working as a sports features writer and, later, a news feature writer. In 2007, Crossroads, his four-part series on the 1967 Newark riots won the New Jersey Press Association's top prize for enterprise reporting. He now lives in Virginia with his wife and two small children.

Career
Parks began writing fiction at age 26 in the cafe at a Barnes & Noble as a way to kill time while his wife was studying for her graduate degree.
The inspiration for his first published novel, Faces of the Gone, was a 2004 quadruple homicide in Newark that he covered as a journalist. The novel sold to St. Martin's Press/Minotaur Books in 2008 to be published on December 8, 2009. Prior to publication, Harlan Coben called it a "terrific debut." Library Journal gave it a starred review calling it "the most hilariously funny and deadly serious mystery debut since Janet Evanovich's One for the Money." The novel went on to win the 2010 Shamus Award for best first novel; and the 2010 Nero Award for best American mystery. Faces of the Gone is the only book to have ever won both awards.

Parks' second book, Eyes of the Innocent, was based on Parks' reporting of the Subprime mortgage crisis and House flipping that became common in Newark and other cities prior to the Global financial crisis of 2008–2009. It received a starred review from Library Journal, which called it "as good if not better (than) his acclaimed debut." The Wall Street Journal described protagonist Ross as "engaging" and said the book was "a capable follow-up to this author's award-winning debut." The Free Lance–Star described it as "a book that melds the style of a Bob Woodward and a Janet Evanovich."

Parks' third book, The Girl Next Door, delves into the struggles of the newspaper industry and how a contentious union negotiation ends up imperiling a woman described as being like the girl next door. The novel won the Lefty Award for best humorous mystery. In doing so, Parks became the first author to have won the Lefty, Nero and Shamus Awards. The Girl Next Door also received a starred review from Booklist, which called it "... a masterpiece." Library Journal called the Carter Ross series "a refreshing tonic for the mystery soul.". Shelf Awareness gave it a starred review, calling it "perfect for the reader who loves an LOL moment but wants a mystery that's more than empty calories." Kirkus Reviews named it one of the top 100 works of fiction of 2012, making it one of just a handful of mysteries to win that honor.

Parks' fourth book, The Good Cop, deals with the subject of illegal gun smuggling and starts with the suicide of a Newark police officer. It received a starred review from Booklist, which called it "a tautly written page-turner with charm and humor." Library Journal opined "Parks's award-winning series is essential reading." RT Book Reviews said the book "will please even the most discerning reader." The Associated Press called it "a great lighthearted read." It won the 2014 Shamus Award in the category of Best Hardcover Novel. In doing so, Parks became the first former Best First Shamus Award winner to subsequently win Best Hardcover Novel.

The fifth book in the Carter Ross series, The Player, delves into the topics of toxic waste and organized crime. It received starred reviews from Kirkus Reviews and Library Journal. The Washington Post called it "one of the best portraits of a working reporter since (Michael) Connelly's THE POET." RT Book Reviews made it a "Top Pick!" and opined, "Parks has quietly entered the top echelon of the mystery field."

The sixth book in the series, The Fraud, chronicles two incidents of carjacking, one afflicting a wealthy man from the suburbs, the other a poorer man from the city. Kirkus Reviews called it, “More deeply felt than Carter’s first five cases: reliable entertainment that’ll make you think twice about your next trip to Newark.”   The novel was nominated for a Library of Virginia People's Choice Award in 2016.

Parks released his first standalone novel, and his first novel published by Dutton Books in 2017. Entitled Say Nothing, it tells the story of a judge whose children are kidnapped by people who are looking to control the outcome of a case the judge is hearing. It received endorsements from Lee Child, Sue Grafton, Jeffery Deaver, Joseph Finder, Chris Pavone, and William Landay, in addition to starred reviews from Publishers Weekly, Kirkus, and Library Journal. The Washington Post called it, "deeply moving. How moving? Its ending brought me to tears, and, where books are concerned, such moments are rare." The Richmond Times-Dispatch called it "the work of an author who continues to raise his sights and refine his immense talent."

In addition, Say Nothing has been translated into fifteen languages and sold in dozens of countries worldwide. It was named Thriller of the Month by The Times of London. It became a bestseller in Germany, where it appeared for multiple weeks in the Der Spiegel Buchreport. It also won the Library of Virginia People's Choice Award.

Parks published Closer Than You Know in March 2018. It received starred reviews from Library Journal and Kirkus Reviews, the latter of which called it "another irresistible descent into hell."

Parks has become known for writing his novels at a Hardee's restaurant. In response, Hardee's has presented Parks with a plaque and declared him its writer in residence.

Bibliography
 Faces of the Gone (2009); Winner, 2010 Shamus Award; Winner, 2010 Nero Award
 Eyes of the Innocent (2011)
 The Girl Next Door (2012); Winner, 2013 Lefty Award
 The Good Cop (2013); Winner, 2014 Shamus Award; Winner, 2014 Lefty Award
 The Player (2014)
 The Fraud (2015); Finalist, Library of Virginia People's Choice Award
 Say Nothing (2017); Winner, Library of Virginia People's Choice Award
 Closer Than You Know (March 2018)
 The Last Act (2019)
 Interference (2020)

References

External links
 
 Brad Parks Page on Fantastic Fiction
 Brad Parks page on RT Book Reviews

1974 births
Living people
21st-century American novelists
American male novelists
American mystery writers
Dartmouth College alumni
People from Ridgefield, Connecticut
The New York Times people
The Washington Post journalists
Novelists from Connecticut
Novelists from New Jersey
21st-century American male writers
21st-century American non-fiction writers
American male non-fiction writers